Schwarz Weiss (English: Black White) is a studio album by Austrian recording artist Christina Stürmer. Compromising alterations of songs from her first two albums Freier Fall (2003) and Soll das wirklich alles sein? (2004), it was released on 30 May 2005 by Polydor Records, serving as her debut album in Germany and Switzerland.

The songs "Ich Lebe", "Vorbei" and "Engel fliegen einsam" were released as singles. Stürmer won the 2005 "Single of the year" Amadeus Austrian Music Award with "Engel fliegen einsam". The album was certified 2× Platinum  in Germany and Gold in Switzerland.

Track listing

Special features
As special features the CD contains the music videos for Vorbei and Ich lebe along with an exclusive interview with Christina Stürmer. These can be viewed when the CD is played on a computer.

Charts

Weekly charts

Year-end charts

Certifications

References

External links 
 

Christina Stürmer albums
2005 albums
Polydor Records albums
German-language albums